Rangrooti Khera is a village in mandal of Assandh in Karnal district of Haryana. It is about 5 km from Assandh and 2.85 km from Jabhala.

Near villages
Khanda Kheri
Jhinda
Ratak (Assandh)
Uplana
Jabhala
Jai Singh Pur

Caste
NAI
Ror
Chamar
Jhimar
Brahamn
Harison
 pal
Jaat

Controversial Death
In  June 2014, all four members of a family, including two children, were burnt alive in a fire at house of a farmer in Rangruti Kehra village, 45 km from Karnal, on Saturday.
Surinder (35), his wife Usha (30) and children Anuj (10) and Anjali (8) died in their sleep and their bodies were charred beyond recognition.
The cause for the fire was yet to be ascertained. Forensic experts inspected the spot and collected evidence and DNA samples. The bodies were sent to the PGI in Rohtak for postmortem examination.
The incident came to light around 11 am when Surinder's sister visited the house. She saw the four charred bodies lying in a room. The news spread like wildfire. The police rushed to the spot.
Surinder's mother Vidya Devi alleged that her family were murdered. Assandh DSP Shyam Lal assured the family that a fair inquiry would be conducted into this case.
Forensic experts hinted that the fire might have been caused by a ‘beedi’ or cigarette. The initial report suggested suffocation as the cause of death.
"We are investigating the cause. The forensic team has collected evidence to determine the cause of the fire. DNA samples have been collected," the DSP said.
He added that the police would investigate the allegation of Surinder's mother. Village residents said the family were found burnt alive in the morning, but nobody saw flames or heard screams from the house.

School
Government Primary School

References

Villages in Karnal district